Caeau Capel Hendre is a Site of Special Scientific Interest in Carmarthen & Dinefwr, Wales.

Notes

See also
List of Sites of Special Scientific Interest in Carmarthen & Dinefwr

Sites of Special Scientific Interest in Carmarthen & Dinefwr